Tai Tau Chau may refer to two islands of Hong Kong:
 Tai Tau Chau (Southern District), geographically off the coast of the Shek O Peninsula, southern Hong Kong Island, the Southern District
 Tai Tau Chau (Sai Kung District), geographically off the coast of the Sai Kung Peninsula, the Sai Kung District